The Gran Premio Fred Mengoni was a professional one day cycling race held annually in Italy. It was part of UCI Europe Tour in category 1.2 from 2005 to 2006 and 1.1 in 2008.

Winners

References

Cycle races in Italy
UCI Europe Tour races
Recurring sporting events established in 2001
Recurring sporting events disestablished in 2008
2001 establishments in Italy
2008 disestablishments in Italy
Defunct cycling races in Italy